The Ibar Rocks are two rocks located  east of Bonert Rock and  southeast of Canto Point, Greenwich Island, in the South Shetland Islands. The names "Islote Ibar" and "Islote Teniente Ibar" appearing on Chilean hydrographic charts in the 1950s refer to the larger and western rock. The recommended name "Ibar Rocks" includes a submerged outlier to the northeast of the larger rock. Teniente (lieutenant) Mario Ibar P. signed the official act of inauguration of the Chilean Captain Arturo Prat Base on Greenwich Island in 1947.

See also 
 Composite Antarctic Gazetteer
 List of Antarctic islands south of 60° S
 SCAR
 Territorial claims in Antarctica

Maps
 L.L. Ivanov. Antarctica: Livingston Island and Greenwich, Robert, Snow and Smith Islands. Scale 1:120000 topographic map.  Troyan: Manfred Wörner Foundation, 2009.

References

External links
 SCAR Composite Antarctic Gazetteer

Islands of the South Shetland Islands